Mahedi Hasan (born 12 December 1994) is a Bangladeshi cricketer who plays for Khulna Division and the Bangladesh cricket team. He made his international debut for Bangladesh in February 2018.

Domestic career
Mahedi made his Twenty20 (T20) debut on 8 November 2016 playing for Barisal Bulls in the 2016–17 Bangladesh Premier League.

In October 2018, Mahedi was named in the squad for the Comilla Victorians team, following the draft for the 2018–19 Bangladesh Premier League. In November 2018, while bowling for South Zone in the 2018–19 Bangladesh Cricket League, he took his maiden five-wicket haul in first-class cricket. In August 2019, he was one of 35 cricketers named in a training camp ahead of Bangladesh's 2019–20 season. In November 2019, he was selected to play for the Dhaka Platoon in the 2019–20 Bangladesh Premier League.

International career
In February 2018, Mahedi was named in Bangladesh's Twenty20 International (T20I) squad for their series against Sri Lanka. He made his T20I debut for Bangladesh against Sri Lanka on 18 February 2018. He was again added to the squad for first two T20Is in the 2019–20 Bangladesh Tri-Nation Series, but did not play and was dropped from the next two T20Is. In November 2019, he was named in Bangladesh's squad for the 2019 ACC Emerging Teams Asia Cup in Bangladesh. Later the same month, he was named in Bangladesh's squad for the men's cricket tournament at the 2019 South Asian Games. The Bangladesh team won the gold medal, after they beat Sri Lanka by seven wickets in the final.

In January 2021, Mahedi was named in Bangladesh's One Day International (ODI) squad for their series against the West Indies. The following month, he was named in Bangladesh's squad for their series against New Zealand. He made his ODI debut for Bangladesh on 20 March 2021, against New Zealand.

In September 2021, he was named in Bangladesh's squad for the 2021 ICC Men's T20 World Cup.

See also
 List of Khulna Division cricketers

References

External links
 

1994 births
Living people
Bangladeshi cricketers
Bangladesh One Day International cricketers
Bangladesh Twenty20 International cricketers
Khulna Division cricketers
Fortune Barishal cricketers
Gazi Group cricketers
Comilla Victorians cricketers
People from Khulna
South Asian Games gold medalists for Bangladesh
South Asian Games medalists in cricket